The Massacre is the second studio album by American rapper 50 Cent. Originally scheduled for a March 8, 2005, release, it was ultimately released on March 4, 2005, by Shady Records, G-Unit Records, Aftermath Entertainment, and Interscope Records. The album debuted at number one on the US Billboard 200, staying atop for six weeks after selling 1.15 million copies in its first four days. Upon its release, The Massacre received generally positive reviews from music critics.

Background 

The original title for the album was revealed as The St. Valentine's Day Massacre (titled after the 1929 North Side, Chicago murder spree of its gang) and was arranged to be released on February 15, 2005. However, it was postponed for the following month, and the album title was shortened to simply The Massacre, due to the release of The Game's The Documentary. Likewise, this was one of the few factors as to why a dispute between the two began. Originally, a certainty of songs that were originally intended to be included on the album were later known to be "Hate It or Love It", "Higher", "How We Do", "Church for Thugs" and "Special", causing a majority of The Massacre to be reworked. After 50 released Game from his G-Unit Records imprint on live radio February 21, 2005, a shootout occurred. Paul Rosenberg of Shady and Jimmy Iovine of Interscope worried that the album would underperform due to the negativity of the Hot 97 shooting. 50 and the Game later entered into a truce six days after The Massacre was released, but their animosity later reiterated after Game made fun of G-Unit at Hot 97's annual Summer Jam, where he first launched the G-Unot phrase, later turning to a boycott. After the album was bootlegged, Interscope decided to announce the album's official March 3 release date after the second planned release date was March 7, 2005.

Censorship 
The censored version of the album censors out most profanity, violence, and all drug content. The track "Gunz Come Out" has inconsistency in the editing, and contains some profanity. The opening intro removes the shooting sequence, and is cut down to 20 seconds. The album cover also removes guns in the background behind the rapper, being replaced by motifs and a gradient background. In comparison, the album is not as heavily censored as his previous album Get Rich or Die Tryin' (2003).

Commercial performance 
With a release in the middle of the sales week, The Massacre sold 1.15 million copies in its first four days of release, becoming the sixth-largest opening week for an album at the time since Nielsen SoundScan began tracking sales in 1991. This is the second largest opening week for a hip hop album, behind Eminem's The Marshall Mathers LP (2000), which sold 1.76 million copies in its first week. In February 2020, The Massacre was certified six times platinum for combined sales and album-equivalent units of at least six million copies in the United States. It has sold over eleven million copies worldwide.

In 2005, The Massacre was ranked as the number one album of the year on the Billboard 200. Sustaining six weeks at number one on the weekly chart from March 19 to April 30, 2005, the album fell off after being ousted by Mariah Carey's The Emancipation of Mimi.

Critical reception 

The Massacre received generally positive reviews from music critics; it holds a score of 66 out of 100 at Metacritic. Vibe magazine found it "full of finger-pointing panache" and wrote that "50 delivers a taut, albeit less explosive, album aimed at both silencing his detractors and keeping the ladies satisfied". NME observed "a new depth to the murderous lyricism" from 50 Cent on the album. Greg Tate, writing in The Village Voice, said that, like Tupac, 50 Cent is "a ruffian who knows the value of a good pop hook", and called The Massacre "the most diabolically sensous collection of baby-making gangsta music since Pac's All Eyez." Kelefa Sanneh of The New York Times found the album to be "nearly as addictive as its predecessor" and called 50 Cent "a crafty songwriter, specializing in obvious but nearly irresistible tracks that sound better the more you hear them." In his review for The Village Voice, Robert Christgau said that 50 Cent's "ugly gangsta lies" are "incidental to the mood of the piece, which is friendly, relaxed, good-humored, and in the groove."

In a mixed review, Nathan Rabin of The A.V. Club said that, although its strengths lie in 50 Cent's "dark charisma" and "fluid delivery", the album is marred by flaws typical of "big rap releases: At nearly 78 minutes, it's far too long, wildly uneven, and not particularly cohesive sonically or thematically." Uncut magazine wrote that, despite 50 Cent's "cool menace", "not even tight productions from Eminem and Dre can stop things from flagging midway." Lynne D. Johnson of Spin felt that it lacks "originality" and makes artistic concessions: "He's tryin' too hard to be everything to everybody." In a negative review for The Guardian, Alexis Petridis panned him as a lyricist and felt that the album lacks "any of the factors that make the best gangsta rap disturbingly compelling ... There's nothing except a string of cliches so limited that repetition is unavoidable".

Accolades 
The Massacre was nominated at the 2006 Grammy Awards for Best Rap Album, but lost to Kanye West's Late Registration. It was ranked the twenty fifth best album of the year by Rolling Stone.

According to 50 Cent, the album received more mixed reviews than its predecessor Get Rich Or Die Tryin''' because he was focused more on the hooks and song structure: "People fought love for the things they see are significant. Jimmy Iovine was a producer … he loves the significance of production. He loves Dre. I don’t give a fuck what I made … look, I made my whole second album as a 10-record. I knew they wasn’t my best verses but my choruses were right so I focused on my song structure."

 Track listing 

Notes
 signifies an additional producer.
"Intro" is excluded from the 2006 France edition.

Sample credits
"Intro" contains elements from "What Up Gangsta" performed by 50 Cent.
"This Is 50" contains elements from "Things Done Changed" performed by The Notorious B.I.G.
"I'm Supposed to Die Tonight" contains vocal samples of "Vocal Planet" performed by Spectrasonics.
"Gatman and Robbin'" contains replayed elements from "Batman Theme" composed by Danny Elfman.
"Candy Shop" contains a sample of "Love Break" performed by The Salsoul Orchestra (uncredited).
"Outta Control" contains an interpolation from "Set It Off" performed by Strafe.
"Ski Mask Way" contains elements from "What Am I Waiting For" performed by The O'Jays and resung elements from "Cell Therapy" performed by Goodie Mob.
"A Baltimore Love Thing" contains elements from "I'll Be Waiting There for You" performed by The Dells.
"God Gave Me Style" contains elements from "Each Day I Cry a Little" performed by Eddie Kendricks.
"I Don't Need 'Em" contains elements from "Nobody Knows" performed by S.C.L.C.

 Personnel 
Credits for The Massacre adapted from Allmusic.

 50 Cent – executive producer, author
 Bang Out – producer
 Jeff Bass – keyboards, producer
 Mark Bass – producer
 Steve Baughman – engineer, mixing
 Akane Behrens – engineer
 Black Jeruz – producer
 Buck Wild – producer
 Jeff Burns – mixing assistant, assistant
 Dave Cabrera – keyboards
 Tony Campana – engineer
 Larry Chatman – project coordinator
 Lindsay Collins – voices, speech/speaker/speaking part
 Cool – producer
 Ruben Cruz – vocals (background)
 Cue Beats – producer
 Dion Jenkins – vocals (background)
 Disco D – producer
 Dr. Dre – producer, executive producer, mixing
 Mike Elizondo – bass, guitar, keyboards, sitar, producer
 Eminem – producer, executive producer, mixing
 Nicole Frantz – creative assistance
 Brian "Big Bass" Gardener – mastering
 Yvette Gayle – publicity
 Zach Gold – photography
 Scott Gutierrez – assistant engineer, assistant
 Tiffany Hasbourne – stylist
 Adam Hawkins – engineer
 Marcus Heisser – A&R
 Hi-Tek – producer
 Lionel Holoman – keyboards
 Kameron Houff – engineer
 Eric Hudson – bass
 Mauricio "Veto" Irragorri – engineer, mixing
 Tyrue "Slang" Jonas – artwork
 Rouble Kapoor – assistant engineer, mixing assistant, assistant

 Steven King – bass, guitar, mixing
 Marc Labelle – A&R
 Chris Lighty – management
 Steve Lininger – assistant engineer, assistant
 Jared Lopez – engineer
 Mike Lynn – A&R
 Andrew Mains – editing
 Tracy McNew – A&R
 Kyla Miller – engineer
 Riggs Morales – A&R
 Needlz – producer
 Traci Nelson – vocals (background)
 Alex Ortiz – engineer
 James Oruz – management
 Conesha Owens – vocals (background)
 Kirdis Postelle – project coordinator
 Chuck Reed – engineer
 Luis Resto – horn, keyboards, producer
 Robert "Roomio" Reyes – assistant engineer, assistant
 Roberto Reyes – assistant
 J.R. Rotem – producer
 David Saslow – video
 Kelly Sato – marketing coordinator
 Ed Scratch – engineer
 Les Scurry – production coordination
 Sha Money XL – producer, engineer, executive producer, mixing
 Randy Sosin – video
 Nancie Stern – sample clearance
 Scott Storch – producer
 Chris Styles – producer
 Rob Tewlow – producer
 Patrick Viala – mixing
 Che Vicious – programming
 Barbara Wilson – vocals (background)
 Brandon Winslow – assistant
 Ravid Yosef – editing

 Charts 

Weekly charts

 Year-end charts 

 Certifications 

 Special edition 

 Background 
The album was re-released on September 6, 2005 as the Special edition. It included a remix of "Outta Control" featuring Mobb Deep, which replaces the original version of the song as track eight. This edition included a bonus DVD with music videos for a majority of the album's tracks (with the exclusion of "Disco Inferno", "Gunz Come Out" and the intro), and the trailer for the film Get Rich or Die Tryin', which released two months later. Due to the ongoing feud between 50 Cent and The Game, this version omits the G-Unit remix to "Hate It or Love It" as the twenty-second track. Once the special edition was released, The Massacre re-entered the top three of the Billboard 200 at number two, being blocked from number one by Kanye West's Late Registration. The original version was also re-issued using the special edition track listing leaving out the parts for the DVD.

 Track listing 

Notes
 signifies an additional producer.

Sample credits
Informations taken from The Massacre'' liner notes:
 "Intro" contains elements from "What Up Gangsta" performed by 50 Cent
 "I'm Supposed to Die Tonight" contains  samples of "Warning" by The Notorious B.I.G.
 "Gatman and Robbin'" contains replayed elements from "Batman Theme"
 "Candy Shop" contains a sample of "Love Break" performed by The Salsoul Orchestra (uncredited)
 "Ski Mask Way" contains elements from "What Am I Waiting For" performed by The O'Jays and resung elements from "Cell Therapy" performed by Goodie Mob
 "A Baltimore Love Thing" contains elements from "I'll Be Waiting There For You" performed by  The Dells
 "God Gave Me Style" contains elements from "Each Day I Cry A Little" performed by Eddie Kendricks
 "I Don't Need 'Em" contains elements from "Nobody Knows" performed by S.C.L.C.

See also 
 List of number-one albums from the 2000s (UK)
 List of number-one albums in 2005 (New Zealand)
 List of number-one albums of 2005 (Ireland)
 List of number-one albums of 2005 (U.S.)
 Lists of fastest-selling albums

References

External links 
 

2005 albums
50 Cent albums
Aftermath Entertainment albums
Shady Records albums
Albums produced by Buckwild
Albums produced by Dr. Dre
Albums produced by Disco D
Albums produced by Eminem
Albums produced by Scott Storch
Albums produced by Hi-Tek
Albums produced by J. R. Rotem
Albums produced by Needlz
Albums produced by Mike Elizondo
Interscope Records albums
Interscope Geffen A&M Records albums